Flue gas condensation is a process, where flue gas is cooled below its water dew point and the heat released by the resulting condensation of water is recovered as low temperature heat.   

Cooling of the flue gas can be performed either directly with a heat exchanger or indirectly via a condensing scrubber.

Excess condensed water must continuously be removed from the process.

The downstream gas is saturated with water, so even though significant amounts of water may have been removed from the cooled gas, it is likely to leave a visible stack plume of water vapor. 

The heat recovery potential of flue gas condensation is highest for fuels with a high moisture content (e.g. biomass and municipal waste), and where heat is useful at the lowest possible temperatures. Thus flue gas condensation is normally implemented at biomass fired boilers and waste incinerators connected district heating grids with relatively low return temperatures (below approximately ).

Efficiency exceeding 100 %

Flue gas condensation may cause the heat recovered to exceed the Lower Heating Value of the input fuel, and thus an efficiency greater than 100%.  Since historically most combustion processes have not condensed the fuel, usual efficiency calculations assume the combustion products are not condensed. This assumption is implicit when basing calculations on the Lower Heating Value.  A more rigorous approach would be to base efficiency calculations on the Higher Heating Value, which typically results in efficiencies less than 100%.

See also 

 Condensing boiler
 Scrubber
 Wet scrubber
 Heat exchanger
 District heating
 Energy

References

External links 
 On Flue gas Condensation  by Götaverken Miljö AB

Scrubbers
Industrial processes
Heat exchangers